Mississippi elected its member August 7–8, 1820.

See also 
 1820 and 1821 United States House of Representatives elections
 List of United States representatives from Mississippi

1820
Mississippi
United States House of Representatives